Tim Wallburger (born 18 August 1989, Dresden) is a German swimmer. He competed at the 2012 Summer Olympics in the 4 × 200 m freestyle relay and finished in fourth place. He won a silver and a gold medal in this event at the European championships in 2010 and 2012, respectively.

References

External links 
 
Tim Wallburger. schwimmen.dsv.de
Tim Wallburger. deutsche-olympiamannschaft.de

1989 births
Living people
Swimmers from Dresden
People from Bezirk Dresden
German male freestyle swimmers
German male butterfly swimmers
Olympic swimmers of Germany
Swimmers at the 2012 Summer Olympics
European Aquatics Championships medalists in swimming